Lock 'n' Chase (ロック・ン・チェイス) is a video game developed by Data East and released in arcades in Japan in 1981. It was licensed to Taito for distribution in North America. A maze game, Lock 'n' Chase was Data East's response to Pac-Man. Home versions for the Intellivision and Atari 2600 were published by Mattel in 1982 and an Apple II version in January 1983.

An updated version was published for the Game Boy in 1990.

Gameplay

The game's protagonist is a thief. The object of the game is to enter a maze and collect all the coins and, if possible, any other treasure that may appear. The thief must then exit the maze (a vault) without being apprehended by the Super D (policemen). The thief can close doorways within the maze in order to temporarily trap the Super D and allow him to keep his distance from them. Only two doors can be closed at a time. The Super D policemen are named Stiffy, Scaredy, Smarty, and Silly.

Coins (depicted as dots) are worth 20 points each. In every level, money bags randomly appear in the center of the maze. Money bags are worth 500, 1000, 2000, and up to 4000 points, respectively, for each time they appear. Each level also has a specific treasure that appears near the center of the maze (much like the food items in Pac-Man). These treasures include the following items (listed respectively by level): top hat, crown, briefcase, and telephone. The first three of these treasures are worth 200 points, 300 points and 500 points, respectively. Additional treasures and their point values are revealed as the player completes successive levels.

Legacy
A clone for the Atari 8-bit family was published in 1984 as Money Hungry.

In 1990, Data East produced an updated version of Lock 'n' Chase for the Nintendo Game Boy.

The original Lock 'n' Chase is included in the Nintendo Wii release Data East Arcade Classics and on the PlayStation Network, both in 2010. The Game Boy version was released on the Nintendo 3DS Virtual Console on January 19, 2012.

On June 16, 2018, Jason Vasiloff set a world record of 136,140 points at the Funspot Family Fun Center in New Hampshire.

Lock 'n' Chase is one of several Data East games featured in the video game Heavy Burger.

A remake has been announced for the Intellivision Amico.

See also
 Lady Bug
 Mouse Trap

References

External links
 
 Lock 'n' Chase at Intellivision Lives
 Lock 'n' Chase at Atari Mania

1981 video games
Apple II games
Arcade video games
Atari 2600 games
Data East arcade games
Data East video games
Game Boy games
Intellivision games
Mattel video games
Multiplayer and single-player video games
Multiplayer hotseat games
Pac-Man clones
PlayStation Network games
Taito arcade games
Video games about crime
Video games developed in Japan
Virtual Console games